The 2016 Pan American Aerobic Gymnastics Championships were held in Lima, Peru, November 24–27, 2016. The competition was organized by the Peruvian Gymnastics Federation, and approved by the International Gymnastics Federation.

Participating countries

Medalists

References

Pan American Aerobic Gymnastics Championships
International gymnastics competitions hosted by Peru
Pan American Aerobic Gymnastics Championships
Pan American Aerobic Gymnastics Championships
Pan American Gymnastics Championships